Walter William Dudley  was an English professional footballer who played as a full-back in the Football League for Nottingham Forest.

Born in Rotherham and living in Lenton, Dudley spent 14 years at Nottingham Forest, first joining the club in 1900. He played in both full-back positions, often partnering Charlie Craig. In 1905, he travelled with Forest on their tour of Argentina and Uruguay. He made 299 competitive appearances for the club, including 278 Football League appearances between 1902 and 1914, and also played in 13 friendly matches.

After leaving Forest in 1914, Dudley played the following season at Mansfield Mechanics and Doncaster Rovers.

During World War I, Dudley served with the Royal Garrison Artillery, seeing action at Vimy Ridge, Messines, Ypres and Passchendaele. He was awarded the Military Medal in 1918.

References

1882 births
Year of death missing
Place of death missing
Footballers from Rotherham
People from Lenton, Nottingham
Footballers from Nottinghamshire
English footballers
Association football fullbacks
Nottingham Forest F.C. players
Doncaster Rovers F.C. players
English Football League players
Royal Garrison Artillery soldiers
British Army personnel of World War I
Recipients of the Military Medal
Military personnel from Yorkshire